TPA may refer to:

Business and finance
 Third-party access, a competition principle regarding natural resources
 Third-party administrator for processing insurance claims
 Tonnes per annum
 Tons per acre, wine grape production term for estimating yield

Law
 Trade Practices Act 1974, Australian competition law legislation
 Trade Promotion Authority, a power of the US president

Organisations
 Political Union of Economists, former Latvian political party
 TaxPayers' Alliance, a British free-market lobby group
 Tempe Preparatory Academy, a preparatory secondary school in Arizona, U.S.
 Texas Pharmacy Association, U.S.
 Theta Phi Alpha a collegiate women's fraternity. Formerly known as TPA, now Theta Phi Alpha.
 Toronto Paramedic Association, Canada
 Travelers Protective Association

Science and medicine
 Terephthalic acid, an aromatic acid and monomer for Aramid
 Tetradecanoyl phorbol acetate (12-O-Tetradecanoylphorbol-13-acetate), a tumor promoter drug
 Tissue plasminogen activator (tPA), a fibrinolytic enzyme in biochemistry and medicine
 Transpalatal arch, an orthodontic device
 Tris(2-pyridylmethyl)amine
 Two-photon absorption

Television
 Televisão Pública de Angola, the state-owned TV station in Angola
 Televisión Pública Argentina, a television network in Argentina
 Television Programs of America, a television production company of the 1950s
 Televisión del Principado de Asturias, broadcaster in Asturias, Spain

Transport
 Tampa International Airport, by IATA code
 Tanzania Ports Authority
 Toronto Parking Authority, Canada
 Toronto Port Authority, Canada

Other
 Taipei Assassins, a Taiwanese esports team
 Terapascal (TPa), a unit of pressure or stiffness 
 The Pinball Arcade,  a pinball video game developed by FarSight Studios
 Thermal Protective Aid, an aluminized polyethylene suit 
 Thickened pyrophoric agent, triethylaluminium used as an incendiary weapon
 Third-party authentication, term usually applied to an app which enables a type of multi-factor authentication
 TPA Tour, name for the US golf PGA Tour for a few months in 1981-2
 Trade Practices Act 1974, the predecessor to the Competition and Consumer Act 2010, Australian legislation
 Transient program area, in a CP/M computer system

See also